Aeshna, or the mosaic darners, is a genus of dragonflies from the family Aeshnidae. Species within this genus are generally known as "hawkers" (Old World) or "darners" (New World).

Description 

These are relatively large dragonflies. Their thoraces and abdomens are brown in color, with blue or yellow stripes or spots on the thorax, and yellow, blue or green spots on the abdomen.

Natalia von Ellenrieder's 2003 paper demonstrated that the Holarctic and Neotropical species placed in this genus did not share a common ancestor, and proposed the latter be placed in the genus Rhionaeschna.

The name Aeshna was coined by the Danish entomologist Fabricius in the 18th century. The name may have resulted from a printer's error in spelling the Greek Aechma, "a spear". The spelling Aeschna has been intermittently used over a period of time, but is now abandoned for the original name Aeshna. However, derived genus names (such as Rhionaeschna) retain the 'sch' spelling, as this is how they were first cited.

Species 

Many species formerly included in Aeshna have been split into other genera, including Afroaeschna, Andaeschna, Pinheyschna, Rhionaeschna, and Zosteraeschna.

The genus Aeshna includes these species:
Aeshna affinis  – southern migrant hawker, blue-eyed hawker
†Aeshna andancensis 
Aeshna athalia 
Aeshna caerulea  – azure hawker
Aeshna canadensis  – Canada darner
Aeshna clepsydra  – mottled darner
Aeshna constricta  – lance-tipped darner
Aeshna crenata  – Siberian hawker
Aeshna cyanea  – blue hawker, southern hawker
Aeshna eremita  – lake darner
Aeshna frontalis 
Aeshna grandis  – brown hawker
Aeshna interrupta  – variable darner
Aeshna isoceles – Norfolk Hawker
Aeshna juncea  – common hawker, sedge darner, moorland hawker
Aeshna mixta  – migrant hawker
Aeshna palmata  – paddle-tailed darner
Aeshna persephone  – Persephone's darner
Aeshna petalura 
Aeshna septentrionalis  – azure darner
Aeshna serrata  – Baltic hawker
Aeshna shennong 
Aeshna sitchensis  – zigzag darner
Aeshna subarctica  – bog hawker, subarctic darner
Aeshna tuberculifera  – black-tipped darner
Aeshna umbrosa  – shadow darner
Aeshna vercanica 
Aeshna verticalis  – green-striped darner
Aeshna viridis  – green hawker
Aeshna walkeri  – Walker's darner
Aeshna williamsoniana  – Williamson's darner

References

External links 

 Aeshna, BugGuide
Corbet, P. S. 1999. Dragonflies: Behavior and Ecology of Odonata. Cornell University Press, Ithaca, New York, USA, 829pp.
von Ellenrieder, N., 2003. A synopsis of the Neotropical species of 'Aeshna' Fabricius: the genus Rhionaeschna Förster (Odonata: Aeshnidae). - Tijdschrift voor Entomologie 146 (1): 67-207.

Aeshnidae
Taxa named by Johan Christian Fabricius
Anisoptera genera